The Dolphin East-West Expressway is a , six-lane, divided controlled-access highway, with the westernmost  as an all-electronic tollway signed as State Road 836 (SR 836), and the easternmost  between Interstate 95 (I-95) and SR A1A cosigned as Interstate 395 (I-395). The road currently extends from just north of the intersection of Southwest 137th Avenue and U.S. Highway 41 (US 41) in Tamiami, eastward past the Homestead Extension of Florida's Turnpike (SR 821) and Miami International Airport, before intersecting I-95, becoming I-395 and ending at SR A1A in Miami at the west end of the MacArthur Causeway. The Dolphin Expressway is maintained and operated by the Miami-Dade Expressway Authority (MDX), while the I-395 section is maintained by the Florida Department of Transportation (FDOT). The Dolphin Expressway from the Palmetto Expressway to I-95 opened in 1969, with the I-395 section opening in 1971, the extension to the HEFT opening in 1974 and a second western extension opening in 2007.

Route description

The highway begins just north of the intersection of Southwest 137th Avenue (unsigned SR 825) and U.S. Highway 41 (SR 90) in Tamiami, built in 2007 and initially accessible only to motorists with SunPass transponders, passing through the first toll gantry. The expressway heads east towards the Homestead Extension of the Turnpike, and then passes through the second of four toll gantries. It then intersects with the Palmetto Expressway (SR 826) at the recently rebuilt Dolphin–Palmetto Interchange, and passes through the southern end of the Miami International Airport. With the failure of FDOT to build either the previously planned airport spur or the proposed LeJeune Road Expressway to give additional access to the airport, Miami-Dade County's sole complete east–west throughway is now often congested, most commonly in the stretch between the Palmetto Expressway (SR 826) and LeJeune Road (SR 953). During this stretch, the expressway have interchanges with NW 72nd Avenue, a third toll gantry, NW 57th Avenue, and a partial with NW 45th Avenue before reaching LeJeune Road. East of the interchange with the airport at LeJeune Road, The expressway has interchanges with NW 37th Avenue and NW 27th Avenue (SR 9), and then reaches the fourth and final toll gantry just west of downtown. The highway has two more interchanges in the fringes of downtown with NW 17th Avenue and NW 12th Avenue before intersecting with I-95 at the Midtown Interchange and becoming a free road and unsigned as Interstate 395 goes into downtown Miami.

I-395 heads east as an elevated, six-lane expressway into downtown Miami. The feeder lanes from I-95 to eastbound I-395 make up a separate three lane ramp to the right of I-395, with the exit to US 1/US 41 being a left exit from the I-395 lanes and a right exit from the I-95 feeder lanes. The feeder lanes then merge into three lanes, heading east towards the MacArthur Causeway, with I-395 and SR 836 terminating just east of an entrance ramp with US 1 (SR 5)/US 41, and continuing as SR A1A.

Tolls
The Dolphin Expressway is an all-electronic toll road that only accepts tolls via SunPass transponders or billing by the toll-by-plate at double cost. The toll road does not accept cash. Toll gantries are located along the expressway and on interchange ramps, eliminating all "free movement" sections that existed in the past. As of November 15, 2014, the total toll for traffic traveling along the expressway from Northwest 137th Avenue to Interstate 95 is $2.40 for SunPass users, and $4.80 for Toll-by-Plate users.

History

Originally envisioned as the Twentieth Street Tollway in 1964 (with a spur to the airport along LeJeune Road), construction on the Fourteenth Street east–west Expressway between the Palmetto Expressway and US 1 started in 1967 and was completed in 1969. Two years later, construction of the western extension to Florida's Turnpike commenced, and was finished in 1974. Also in 1974, the name of the tollway was changed to commemorate the success of the Miami Dolphins of the NFL, after back-to-back wins in the Super Bowl.

The section of SR 836 signed as I-395 was supposed to open with the rest of the Dolphin Expressway in 1968, but was delayed due to a freeze at the federal level for road spending. The expressway opened on March 26, 1971.

Initial plans for the Interstate 75 extension to Miami in 1968 would have had used the Dolphin Expressway as its final link to Interstate 95 (I-75 would have crossed the Everglades via the Tamiami Trail under this plan). However, these plans were abandoned in 1973 in favor of I-75's current route farther north. The fact that the Dolphin Expressway was not built to interstate standards was one of the factors in changing I-75's proposed route.

Construction of a second westward extension of SR 836 started in 2004. This extension, westward to Northwest 137th Avenue near Northwest 12th Street, opened June 22, 2007, was initially accessible only to motorists with SunPass electronic toll-paying capability; there is no capacity for the collection of cash. The road has since opened to non SunPass users with the Toll by Plate system.

Until July 1, 2007, the toll for eastbound automobiles was $1.25 ($1.00 for motorists with SunPass), paid at a toll booth between Northwest 22nd and Northwest 17th Avenues (toll is not collected from westbound traffic). In conjunction with the completion of the new three-mile-long extension west of the Turnpike, tolls of $1.00 (75 cents for motorists with SunPass) were collected from traffic in both directions west of SR 973 (Northwest 87th Avenue/Galloway Road). Although the new toll was originally stated to be only for the extension, motorists going to the Florida Turnpike or Northwest 107th Avenue also have to pay.

On July 21, 2013, the eastbound toll plaza near I-95 ceased cash collection and became all electronic, with those paying with SunPass paying $1, and Toll by Plate users paying $2.

On November 15, 2014, the Dolphin Expressway became an all electronic toll road, no longer collecting cash, and the only ways to pay are either by the SunPass transponders or billing by the toll-by-plate program, at double the cost of SunPass users. Toll gantries are located along the expressway and on interchanges to where there are no "free movement" sections of the expressway as existed previously. The move was first announced in 2010, and along with the nearby Airport Expressway, was the last of the MDX expressways to be converted to open road tolling.

On May 24, 2010, construction began on the Port Miami Tunnel, a $1 billion project that connects the port to other major highway arteries, including I-395, with the tunnel opening on August 3, 2014.

Future
Short range plans include the construction of additional lanes to match the rebuilt, higher capacity Dolphin-Palmetto Interchange, with SR 826. A planned third extension (southward to Southwest 136th Street) is currently being considered, though may have been replaced with the widening of the rural surface road Krome Avenue to four lanes. In 2021 the controversial extension, known as the Kendall Parkway, was still under consideration.

The Dolphin Expressway is home to two of the state's three diverging-diamond interchanges after the reconstruction of two exits at Northwest 27th Avenue and Northwest 57th Avenue.

Long-term plans in the 2020s call for a double-decker span of SR 836 (from NW 17 Avenue, rising over the center of the existing SR 836 roadway, and touching down at I-395, east of the I-95 interchange), and a complete replacement of the I-395 sector (from I-95 to the MacArthur Causeway), with a new "signature" cable-stayed bridge extending across it and over Biscayne Boulevard. Community parks, art installations, and urban green spaces will be designed underneath the 1.4 mile stretch. The $802 million project is known as "Connecting Miami" and will be coordinated between the Florida Department of Transportation (FDOT) and the Miami-Dade Expressway Authority (MDX). Construction began in January 2019, with completion estimated for late 2023.

Exit list
Exits are unnumbered on the MDX-maintained section.

See also

References

External links

 FDOT GIS data
 Florida @ SouthEastRoads - Interstate 395 and Florida 836
 Connecting Miami Project

836
836
836
836
Freeways in the United States
1969 establishments in Florida
Expressways in Miami
Expressways in Miami-Dade County, Florida